

Music
 Motion City Soundtrack, a pop punk / rock band from Minneapolis, Minnesota

Science and technology
 Matrix cable system, submarine communications cable connecting Indonesia and Singapore
 Megawatt Charging System, electric vehicle charging connector
 Modulation and coding scheme, in the telecommunications industry
 Mercalli-Cancani-Sieberg, a scale of earthquake intensity, successor to the Mercalli intensity scale
 Mesoscale convective system, a complex of thunderstorms

Biology and medicine
 Membrane contact site, within cells
 Minimally conscious state, a disorder of consciousness
 Multiple chemical sensitivity, an unrecognized and controversial medical diagnosis characterized by chronic symptoms attributed to exposure to low levels of commonly used chemicals
 Multiple cloning site, the region of restriction enzyme sites in a plasmid

Computing
 Master of Computer Science
 Multiple Console Support, in OS/360 and successors
 Multi categories security, in Security-Enhanced Linux
 Multinational Character Set, used in VT220 terminals
 Music Construction Set, a music composition notation program
 MCS algorithm (Multilevel Coordinate Search), a derivative-free optimization algorithm
 Micro Computer Set, a set of instructions implemented by a computer architecture such as in the Intel MCS 51 CPU

Organizations
 Marcus Corporation (NYSE symbol)
 Marine Conservation Society, UK
 Methodist Church in Singapore
 MCS (fashion brand) (formerly Marlboro Classics), an Italian clothing brand
 Microgeneration Certification Scheme (MCS) Service Company Limited, the UK's body that certifies low-carbon products and installations used to produce electricity and heat from renewable sources (largely domestic solar panels and heat pumps)

Schools
 Canada
 Master's College and Seminary, Peterborough, Ontario
 Hong Kong
 Maryknoll Convent School, Kowloon Tong
 Ireland
 Malahide Community School, Dublin
 Philippines
 Malate Catholic School, Manila
 Mater Carmeli School, Quezon City, Metro Manila
 Pakistan
 Military College of Signals, Rawalpindi, Punjab
 Murree Christian School, Jhika Gali, Punjab
 United Kingdom
 Magdalen College School, Oxford, England
 Magdalen College School, Brackley, England
 Michaela Community School, London, England
United States
 Manhattan Country School, New York
 McMinn County Schools, Tennessee
 Mellon College of Science, Carnegie Mellon University, Pittsburgh, Pennsylvania
 Montrose Christian School, Rockville, Maryland
 Murfreesboro City Schools, Murfreesboro, Tennessee

Other uses
 Master of Christian Studies (MCS)
 MCS (Mine countermeasures support ship), a US Navy classification code; See List of mine warfare vessels of the United States Navy
 Management control system
 Michigan Central Station, a former rail station depot in Detroit, Michigan, US
 Millennium Cohort Study, UK